Paulina Andrea Nunez Urrutia (born 30 December 1982) is a Chilean politician from National Renewal. She has been a member of the National Congress of Chile since 2014.

See also 

 LVI legislative period of the Chilean Congress

References 

Living people
1982 births
Catholic University of the North alumni
21st-century Chilean women politicians
People from Antofagasta
National Renewal (Chile) politicians
Members of the Chamber of Deputies of Chile
Women members of the Chamber of Deputies of Chile
Senators of the LVI Legislative Period of the National Congress of Chile